Breaden Heath is a small village in Shropshire, England. It lies right on the border with Wales.

Villages in Shropshire